Cranney is a surname. Notable people with the surname include:

Martin Cranney (1795–1870), Irish-born Canadian politician
Mudgee Cranney (1886–1971), Australian cricketer
Sean Cranney (born 1973), Australian former association football player

See also
Craney